Leon Tol (born 14 January 1987 in Volendam) is a retired Dutch former professional footballer who played as a centre-back.

External links
 Voetbal International profile 

1987 births
Living people
Dutch footballers
FC Volendam players
Eerste Divisie players
Derde Divisie players
People from Volendam

Association football central defenders
Footballers from North Holland